Marakkarkandy is a small coastal village in Kannur district of Kerala state, south India. It is 2 km from Kannur City and 6 km from Kannur town.  People from all religions reside in this small city and is famous for its communal harmony.  It was under the rule of Arakkal Adi Raja (the one and only Muslim royal family in Kerala) before independence.  Rajiv Gandhi Mini Stadium located in this small village plays a major role in enhancing and developing sports and other related activities among youths.  Shamna Kasim, one of the most talented and leading actresses in Indian movies hails from this town.

Nearby suburbs
 Ayikkara
 Neerchal
 Thayyil
 Kuruva
 Maidhanappally
 Avera Hills
 Kanam Beach
 Adi-Kadalayi
 Thottada Beach
 Kodaparamba
 Burnacherry

Image gallery

Suburbs of Kannur